Wenceslao "Mano Lao" Figuereo Cassó (1834 – January 10, 1910) was a Dominican politician. He joined the Los Bolos party politician as a young man. Figuereo became President of the Dominican Republic on July 26, 1899, following the assassination of President Ulises Heureaux.

Early life
Figuereo was born in San Juan de la Maguana  in 1834.

He was born to a half-Taino and half-African enslaved woman by the name of Simona. His father was of noble descent, a plantation owner and slave driver named Telésforo Objío Noble. Objío Noble would later free Simona and Wenceslao and properly partner Simona. Simona changed her name to Catalina when adopted into formal society. Wenceslao, having a strained relationship with Telésforo, would be taken in by the Figuereo plantation and mentored from an early age by the Los Bolos political party.

Figuereo's father and Brigadier General Manuel Rodríguez Objío's mother were siblings, thus, Figuereo and Rodríguez Objío were first cousins.

Political career
Before political success, a 14-year-old Wenceslao Figuereo displayed initiative in Dominican politics in the context of partaking in the pro-independence battles. A decorated General, later on, Los Bolos politician, Wenceslao "Chachi" Figuereo, became the Vice President after undertaking many political positions under the administration of Ulises Heureaux, and after the assassination of the two term President of Dominican Republic in Moca, Dominican Republic on July 26, 1899, Figuereo assumed the presidency. His term as Vice President of the Dominican Republic spanned from 1893 to 1899 and his term as the 27th President of the Dominican Republic spanned from the 26th of July to the 30th of August in 1899.

Figuereo was married to María Isabel Balbina Juanes Sánchez, who became the country's first lady at the age of 64. She remains the oldest woman to become first lady in the Dominican Republic's history.

In 1900 he exiled to Madrid, Spain.

Figuerero died in 1910 at age 76.

References

External links
 WIKIDOMINICANA
 Important Dominican Families
 Dominican Presidents
 Ulises y Figuereo
 WIKIPEDIA Wenceslao Figuereo

|-

1834 births
1910 deaths
People from San Juan Province (Dominican Republic)
Presidents of the Dominican Republic
Vice presidents of the Dominican Republic
Dominican Republic military personnel
Dominican Republic emigrants to Spain